Kelleghan is a surname. Notable people with the surname include:

Fiona Kelleghan (born 1965), American science fiction academic and critic
Pascal Kelleghan, Irish Gaelic footballer